The New Zealand Women's National Handball team is the national handball team of New Zealand and is controlled by the New Zealand Handball Federation.

History 
The Handball New Zealand (HNZ) was founded in 1994. In 2005 a second federation the New Zealand Handball Federation (NZHF) was found.  Both federations had teams at the Oceania Nations Cup 2007 and 2009. In 2006 the New Zealand Olympic Committee (NZOC) suspended the HNZ. Later by the International Handball Federation (IHF). They suspended the HNZ because the HNZ was closely aligned with Vern Winitana president of the Oceania Handball Federation (OHF). He was kicked off the IHF Council in 2009. One week later the IHF Congress recognized the NZHF. In 2010 the Sports Tribunal of New Zealand dismissed the lawsuit of the HNZ against the NZOC for the suspension.

Results

Oceania Nations Cup

Asian Championship

Pacific Cup

Current squad
The team for the 2018 Asian Women's Handball Championship in Japan.

References

External links

IHF profile

National team
Handball Women's
Women's national handball teams